Wang Yafan (born 30 April 1994) is a Chinese tennis player.

In her career, she has won one singles title and three doubles titles on the WTA Tour, as well as four doubles titles on WTA 125 tournaments, plus eleven singles and six doubles titles on the ITF Women's Circuit. On 7 October 2019, she reached her best singles ranking of world No. 47. She peaked at No. 49 in the doubles rankings on 15 February 2016.

Career
She was born in Nanjing in 1994. Wang Yafan started playing tennis when she was nine year old.
Wang made her WTA Tour debut at the 2014 Shenzhen Open, partnering Zheng Jie in doubles. The pair won their first-round match against wildcards Sun Ziyue and Xu Shilin, and defeated third seeds Irina Buryachok and Oksana Kalashnikova, before losing to eventual champions Monica Niculescu and Klára Zakopalová in the semifinals.

In September 2014 at the Guangzhou Open, Wang was given a wildcard into the singles main draw, and she advanced to the semifinals, upsetting the top seed and world No. 20, Samantha Stosur, in the first round, and qualifiers Petra Martić and Zhang Kailin along the way. She was knocked out by eventual champion Monica Niculescu.

Playing for the China Fed Cup team, Wang has a win–loss record of 9–2, as of December 2022.

Wang made her career breakthrough at the 2018 Miami Open, where she reached the fourth round as a qualifier before losing against tenth seed Angelique Kerber, in a very tight match.

2019: First WTA title

Wang won her first ever WTA singles title at the Mexican Open in Acapulco where she defeated Sofia Kenin by 2–6, 6–3, 7–5, after being down a set and a break. She achieved her best world ranking of No. 49.

At the Miami Open, she defeated Kristina Mladenovic in the first round. In the second round, she clinched her first victory against a top-ten player by defeating sixth seed and world No. 5, Elina Svitolina, in straight sets (6–2, 6–4). She kept on and won against 25th seed and Australian Open semifinalist Danielle Collins by 7–5, 6–1, and reached the fourth round, but then lost to compatriot Wang Qiang, in straight sets.

Performance timelines

Only main-draw results in WTA Tour, Grand Slam tournaments, Fed Cup/Billie Jean King Cup and Olympic Games are included in win–loss records.

Singles
Current through the 2021 Wimbledon Championships.

Doubles
Current through the 2021 Wimbledon Championships.

Significant finals

WTA Elite Trophy

Doubles: 1 (1 title)

WTA career finals

Singles: 1 (1 title)

Doubles: 7 (3 titles, 4 runner–ups)

WTA 125 tournament finals

Singles: 1 (1 runner-up)

Doubles: 5 (4 titles, 1 runner–up)

ITF Circuit finals

Singles: 17 (11 titles, 6 runner–ups)

Doubles: 10 (6 titles, 4 runner–ups)

Head-to-head record

Top 10 wins

Notes

References

External links

 
 
 

1994 births
Living people
Sportspeople from Nanjing
Chinese female tennis players
Tennis players at the 2018 Asian Games
Tennis players from Jiangsu
Asian Games competitors for China